The Nigerian Body of Benchers is a professional body concerned with the admission of successful candidates at the Nigerian Law School Bar Final Examination into the Legal Proffession. Members of the body are called Benchers.

The body also regulate the call of graduate of law school to the Nigerian Bar as well as the regulation of the legal profession in Nigeria.

Principal officers
The current Chairman of the body is Chief Wole Olanipekun, OFR, SAN who succeeded Hon. Justice Olabode Rhodes Vivour in March of 2022 after a long list of successions including, the past Chairmen such as Hon. Justice Dr. I. T. Muhammad, CFR, 2019, ALH. Bashir M. Dalhatu,2018, Hon. Justice W.S.N Onnoghen, GCON, 2017, Chief Bandele A. Aiku, SAN, 2016 (deceased), Hon. Justice, Mahmud Mohammed, GCON,2015, Chief T.J.O Okpoko who was elected on March 30, 2014 to succeed Aloma Mariam Mukhtar the Chief Justice of Nigeria and Mahmud Mohammed the vice president at the time.

Notable members
Dahiru Musdapher (1942-2018), Chief Justice of the Supreme Court of Nigeria
Aloma Mariam Mukhtar (b. 1944), first female Chief Justice of Nigeria
Idowu Sofola (1934-2018), President of the Nigerian Bar Association
Kehinde Sofola (1924-2007), Minister of Justice 
Wole Olanipekun (b. 1951), former President of the Nigerian Bar Association and Senior Advocate of Nigeria
Okey Wali (b. 1958), the 26th President of the Nigerian Bar Association
Joseph Bodurin Daudu (b. 1959), former President of the Nigerian Bar Association in 2010-2012
 Mudiaga Odje SAN (1923-2005), President of the Nigerian Bar Association (NBA) in 1974-1976
 Muiz Banire SAN (b. 1966), three-term commissioner of Lagos State
Ishaq Bello (b. 1956), Chief Judge of the Federal Capital Territory (FCT)

References

Nigerian jurists
Law of Nigeria